Marcel "Marc" Guley (May 5, 1912 – November 6, 1990) was an American college basketball player and coach who was head coach of the Syracuse Orange from 1950–1962. He was born in the Austro-Hungarian Empire. He had been an assistant to Lewis Andreas prior to his appointment as head coach. His teams compiled a record of 136 wins and 129 losses with a winning percentage of .513. Guley's tenure as Syracuse's coach was capped off by 1956–1957 team, which was Syracuse's first NCAA tournament appearance. The team went 18–7 on the year, and beat Connecticut and Lafayette before falling to eventual champion North Carolina 67–58 in the Regional Final. Guley left the Orange after the 1961–1962 season, where the team went 2–22. He was replaced by Fred Lewis.

Guley was a graduate of Syracuse University and played guard three seasons for the Orangemen, lettering twice, and was captain of the 1936 team. He also played baseball for Syracuse in 1936. While at Syracuse Guley became a member of the Sigma Chapter of the Phi Kappa Tau fraternity.

After resigning from Syracuse, he coached Physical Education at Cazenovia Elementary Schools for 18 years, retiring in 1980.

Guley also played professional basketball for the Binghamton Triplets (basketball) and Newark Elks, and coached high school basketball in Delhi, New York and Walton, New York. He was a communications officer in the Navy during World War II.

Head Coaching Record

References

 2006–2007 Syracuse Men's Basketball Media Guide

External links
Marc Guley Profile @ OrangeHoops

1912 births
1990 deaths
American men's basketball coaches
American men's basketball players
Basketball coaches from New York (state)
Basketball players from New York (state)
Czechoslovak emigrants to the United States
High school basketball coaches in the United States
Syracuse Orangemen baseball players
Syracuse Orange men's basketball coaches
Syracuse Orange men's basketball players